The Bali Refuse Incineration Plant is an incinerator in Bali District, New Taipei, Taiwan.

History
Designed by the Chinese-American architect I. M. Pei, the construction of the plant started in 1997 and completed in 2001. With a total area of 3.5 hectares, the plant began its commercial operation the same year.

Technical details
The plant has a capacity of treating 1350 tons of garbage per day. To prevent the dissolved dioxin components from recomposing back to life due to temperature drop, an activated carbon injection unit is installed to adsorb heavy metals and dioxins by its porous nature, resulting in a clean air treatment.

See also
 Air pollution in Taiwan

References

2001 establishments in Taiwan
Buildings and structures in New Taipei
Incinerators in New Taipei
Infrastructure completed in 2001